Tighe is an Irish surname, derived from the Old Gaelic O Taidhg. Notable persons with that name include:
Ambrose Tighe (1859–1928), American lawyer, politician, and academic
Andrew Tighe (born 1955), Australian actor
Brad Tighe (born 1984), Australian rugby league player
Charles Tighe, (1927–2004), American lawyer and politician
Eugene F. Tighe (1921–1994), American military officer
Jack Tighe (1913–2002), American baseball manager
James Tighe (born 1982), British wrestler
Jan E. Tighe (born 1962), American military officer
Karen Tighe, Australian sports presenter
Kevin Tighe (born 1944), American actor
Mary Tighe (1772–1810), Irish poet
Richard Lodge Tighe (1902-1938), American politician
Robert Tighe (died 1620), English cleric and linguist
Tommy Tighe, American sports radio broadcaster

References